G programming language may refer to:
 G-code, programming language, used mainly in automation.
 G, the graphical programming language used in LabVIEW.
 G, a programming language for rapid development of OpenGL applications.